Vitor Ricardo Guerra Candido Wach (born 14 April 2000), known as Vitor Ricardo, is a Brazilian professional footballer who plays as a right back for Aparecidense, on loan from Fortaleza.

Club career
Born in Rio de Janeiro, Vitor Ricardo was a Flamengo youth graduate, but left the club in August 2019 to join Palmeiras. He left the latter in 2020, and signed for Fortaleza.

Vitor Ricardo made his first team debut for Leão on 13 March 2021, starting in a 1–1 home draw against Treze, for the year's Copa do Nordeste. Initially assigned to the under-23 squad, he was definitely promoted to the main squad in January 2022.

Vitor Ricardo made his Série A debut on 10 April 2022, starting in a 0–1 home loss against Cuiabá.

Career statistics

Honours
Fortaleza
Copa do Nordeste: 2022
Campeonato Cearense: 2022

References

External links
Fortaleza profile 

2000 births
Living people
Footballers from Rio de Janeiro (city)
Brazilian footballers
Association football defenders
Campeonato Brasileiro Série A players
Fortaleza Esporte Clube players
Associação Atlética Aparecidense players